Larkinella bovis  is a Gram-negative and strictly aerobic bacterium from the genus of Larkinella which has been isolated from fermented bovine products.

References

External links
Type strain of Larkinella bovis at BacDive -  the Bacterial Diversity Metadatabase

Cytophagia
Bacteria described in 2011